"Millennium 2" is a song written by Jan Nordlund, John Henrik Lagerlöf, Stefan Enberg and Daniel Bäckström, and recorded by Markoolio on his 1999 album Dikter från ett hjärta. It was also released as a single on 20 October 1999 and topped the Swedish Singles Chart.

Textually, the song deals with the transition from 1999 to the year 2000.

The song charted at Trackslistan between 30 October-4 December 1999 and also received a Svensktoppen test on 4 December 1999, but failed to enter the chart.

Charts

Weekly charts

Year-end charts

References 

1999 singles
Markoolio songs
New Year songs
Number-one singles in Sweden
Swedish-language songs
1999 songs